Naprzód Jędrzejów is a Polish association football club based in Jędrzejów. In the season 2006/2007 they won promotion to III Liga (three classes below Ekstraklasa)

External links 
 Official Website
 Naprzód Jędrzejów at the 90minut.pl website (Polish)

Association football clubs established in 1928
1928 establishments in Poland
Jędrzejów County
Football clubs in Świętokrzyskie Voivodeship